The Letov Š-16 was a Czechoslovak single-engined, two-seat biplane bomber. It was designed by Alois Šmolík at Letov Kbely. The Š-16 first flew in 1926.

Variants
Š-16Two-seat bomber, reconnaissance biplane.
Š-16JSeaplane version for Yugoslavia. One built.
Š-16LExport version for Latvia.
Š-16TExport version for Turkey. 
Š-116version with Skoda L engine
Š-216version with Walter-built Bristol Jupiter engine
Š-316version with Hispano-Suiza 12N engine
Š-416version with Breitfeld-Danek BD-500 engine
Š-516version with Isotta-Fraschini Asso 750 engine
Š-616version with Hispano-Suiza 12Nbr engine
Š-716version with Skoda L engine
Š-816version with Praga ESV engine
Š-916version with Lorraine-Dietrich engine 
Š-17third prototype Š-16 with a V-12 Breitfeld-Danek (Praga) BD-500 engine

Operators

Czechoslovakian Air Force (115 aircraft)

Aviation Regiment (21 aircraft)

Turkish Air Force (16 aircraft)

Yugoslav Royal Navy (one aircraft)

Specifications (Š-316)

See also

References

Bibliography

S016
1920s Czechoslovakian bomber aircraft
Single-engined tractor aircraft
Biplanes
Aircraft first flown in 1926